Philip Götsch (born 20 July 1984) is an Italian male sky runner, who won Skyrunning World Cup in the vertical kilometer in 2016.

Biography
In October 2017, winning the Limone Vertical Extreme, won the European champion title of Vertical Kilometer.

References

External links
 Philip Götsch profile at Association of Road Racing Statisticians

1984 births
Living people
Italian sky runners